In probability theory, a martingale difference sequence (MDS) is related to the concept of the martingale.  A stochastic series X is an MDS if its expectation with respect to the past is zero. Formally, consider an adapted sequence  on a probability space .  is an MDS if it satisfies the following two conditions:

, and

,

for all . By construction, this implies that if  is a martingale, then  will be an MDS—hence the name.

The MDS is an extremely useful construct in modern probability theory because it implies much milder restrictions on the memory of the sequence than independence, yet most limit theorems that hold for an independent sequence will also hold for an MDS.

In probability theory innovation series is used to emphasize the generality of Doob representation. In signal processing the innovation series is used to introduce Kalman filter. The main differences of innovation
terminologies are in the applications. The later application aims to introduce the nuance of samples to the model by random sampling.

References 
 James Douglas Hamilton (1994),  Time Series Analysis, Princeton University Press. 
 James Davidson (1994), Stochastic Limit Theory, Oxford University Press.  

Martingale theory

random walk 
filtration
Doob decomposition theorem
signal processing
Kalman filter
[[:Category:Innovation (signal processing)]